Archduke Carl Ludwig of Austria (Carl Ludwig Maria Franz Joseph Michael Gabriel Antonius Robert Stephan Pius Gregor Ignatius Markus d'Aviano; 10 March 1918 – 11 December 2007), also known as Carl Ludwig Habsburg-Lothringen, was the fifth child of Charles I of Austria and Princess Zita of Bourbon-Parma. He was born in Baden bei Wien and died in Brussels.

Life
During the Second World War, Karl Ludwig and his brother Felix volunteered to serve in the 101st Infantry Battalion of the United States Army, known as the "Free Austria Battalion". However, the battalion was disbanded when a number of exiled Jewish volunteers who made up the majority of the force ultimately declined to confirm their enlistment.

He was buried beside his mother in the Kapuziner Crypt in Vienna.

Marriage and issue
He was married in Belœil on 17 January 1950 to Princess Yolande of Ligne (born 6 May 1923). They had four children.

 Archduke Rudolf of Austria (Rudolf Maria Carl Eugen Anna Antonius Marcus d'Aviano;born 1950); married Baroness Hélène de Villenfagne de Vogelsanck (b. 1954) in Brussels 3 July 1976, their family taking up residence in Belgium thereafter. On 29 May 1978 he, his children and male-line descendants were incorporated in the nobility of Belgium by royal letters patent with the hereditary title Prince/sse de Habsbourg-Lorraine and the style of Serene Highness. Rudolf works at investment managers AAA Gestion, based in Villars-sur-Glâne, Switzerland and lives at De Diesbach Castle. He and Hélène have eight children:
 Archduke Carl Christian of Austria (b. 1977); married on 2 June 2007 to Estelle de Saint-Romain (b. 1979)
 Archduchess Priscilla of Austria (b. 1979)
 Archduke Johannes of Habsburg-Lorraine (b. 1981), Catholic priest of the Swiss Fraternity Eucharistein
 Archduke Thomas of Austria (b. 1983), member of the Swiss Catholic Fraternity Eucharistein
 Archduchess Marie-des-Neiges of Austria (b. 1986), member of the Swiss Catholic Fraternity Eucharistein
 Archduke Franz-Ludwig of Austria (b. 1988); married in 2018 to Mathilde Vignon (b. 1992)
 Archduke Michael of Austria (b. 1990)
 Archduke Joseph of Austria (b. 1991), member of the Swiss Catholic Fraternity Eucharistein
 Archduchess Alexandra of Austria (born 1952); married Chilean ambassador to the Holy See Héctor Riesle Contreras. Three children:
 Felipe Riesle de Habsburgo-Lorena (b. 1986), married to Pilar García-Huidobro Echeverría.
 María Sofía Riesle de Habsburgo-Lorena (b. 1988), married to Rodrigo Risopatrón Moreno.
 Constanza Riesle de Habsburgo-Lorena (b. 1989), married to Sebastián Prieto Donoso.
 Archduke Carl Christian of Austria (born 1954); married Princess Marie Astrid of Luxembourg. Like his older brother, he works at investment managers AAA Gestion, based in Villars-sur-Glâne, Switzerland. Carl Christian and Marie Astrid have five children:
 Archduchess Marie-Christine Anne Astrid Zita Charlotte of Austria (b. 31 July 1983, Brussels, Belgium). Her engagement was announced on 16 May 2008 to Count Rodolphe Christian Léopold Carl Ludwig Phillipe de Limburg-Stirum (b. 20 March 1979, Uccle, Brussels, Belgium). On 6 December 2008 married in a civil ceremony in Mechelen town hall, Mechelen, Belgium and then a religious ceremony at St. Rumbold's Cathedral in Mechelen, Belgium. They have three sons:
 Count Léopold Menno Philippe Gabriel François-Xavier Marie Joseph Ghislain de Limburg-Stirum (b. 19 April 2011, Buenos Aires, Argentina).
 Count Constantin de Limburg-Stirum (b. 25 October 2013, Buenos Aires, Argentina).
 Count Gabriel de Limburg-Stirum (b. 2016).
 Archduke Imre Emanuel Simeon Jean Carl Marcus d'Aviano of Austria (b. 8 December 1985, Geneva, Switzerland), his engagement to Kathleen Elizabeth Walker (b. 17 April 1986, Cincinnati, Ohio, US), was announced on 22 December 2011. The couple got married on 8 December 2012 at Saint Mary, Mother of God Catholic Church (Washington, D.C.), Washington, D.C., US. and they met in April 2010. They have four daughters:
 Archduchess Maria-Stella Elizabeth Christiana Yolande Alberta of Austria (b. 11 November 2013, Kirchberg, Luxembourg).
 Archduchess Magdalena Maria Alexandra Zita Charlotte of Austria (b. 24 February 2016, Kirchberg, Luxembourg).
 Archduchess Juliana Marie Christine Wilhelmina Margaret Astrid of Austria (b. 14 October 2018, Geneva, Switzerland).
 Archduchess Cecilia Marie Josephine Adelaide Henrietta of Austria (b. 15 January 2021, Geneva, Switzerland).
 Archduke Christoph Henri Alexander Maria Marcus d' Aviano of Austria (b. 2 February 1988, Geneva, Switzerland). His engagement to Adélaïde Marie Béatrice Drapé-Frisch (b. 4 September 1989, Les Lilas, Paris, France), was announced on 22 December 2011. The couple married on 29 December 2012 at Basilica of Saint-Epvre (:fr:Basilique Saint-Epvre de Nancy) in Nancy, France. They have three children:
 Archduchess Katarina Marie-Christine Fabiola of Austria ((b. 22 December 2014, Geneva, Switzerland).
 Archduchess Sophia of Austria (b. 31 August 2017, Geneva, Switzerland).
 Archduke Josef of Austria (b. October 2020, Geneva, Switzerland).
 Archduke Alexander Hector Marie Karl Leopold Marcus d'Aviano of Austria (b. 26 September 1990, Meyrin, Switzerland).
 Archduchess Gabriella Maria Pilar Yolande Joséphine-Charlotte of Austria (b. 26 March 1994, Geneva, Switzerland). She got engaged to Prince Henri Luitpold Antoine Victor Marie Joseph of Bourbon-Parma (b. 14 October 1991, Roskilde, Denmark), on 22 October 2017. The couple got married on 12 September 2020 at Tratzberg Castle, Jenbach, Tyrol, Austria. They have two daughters:
 Princess Victoria Antonia Marie-Astrid Lydia of Bourbon-Parma (b. 30 October 2017, Geneva, Switzerland, born out of wedlock).
 Princess Anastasia Erika Alexandra Marie Yolande of Bourbon-Parma (b. 3 July 2021, Geneva, Switzerland).
 Archduchess Maria Constanza of Austria (born 1957); married Franz Josef, Prince (Fürst) von Auersperg-Trautson. Three biological daughters (one died shortly after her birth) and one adopted daughter, Anna Maria, who adopted the title Princess of Auersperg-Trautson.
 Princess Anna Maria of Auersperg-Trautson (24 September 1997)
 Princess Alexandra Maria of Auersperg-Trautson (b. & d. 9 February 1998)
 Princess Ladislaya of Auersperg-Trautson (26 February 1999)
 Princess Eleonora of Auersperg-Trautson (28 May 2002).

Ancestry

References

1918 births
2007 deaths
House of Habsburg-Lorraine
Knights of the Golden Fleece of Austria
Knights of Malta
People from Baden bei Wien
Burials at the Imperial Crypt
Austrian princes
Sons of emperors
Children of Charles I of Austria
Sons of kings